McKenzie Mountain is a  mountain in western Essex County in the towns of St. Armand and North Elba in the Adirondack Park, a unit of the Forest Preserve.

History 
The mountain was formerly known as Saddleback, due to its shape.  There are two trails to the top. One, maintained by NYSDEC, begins at the Jackrabbit Ski Trail, that runs between Saranac Lake and Lake Placid.  The other, maintained by the Lake Placid Shore Owner's Association, dates to 1896; it leads from the Lake Shore Path to the summit. Views from the top are extensive, from Whiteface Mountain to the north, with Lake Placid at its feet, to Gothics, Mount Marcy and the Great Range, and the Seward Mountains to the south.  A ledge to the west of the trail offers views of the village of Saranac Lake and the Saranac Lakes spread out beyond, Moose Pond, Azure Mountain, Saint Regis Mountain and Debar Mountain to the north.

Gallery

References

External links
 Peakbagger.com - McKenzie Mountain

Mountains of Essex County, New York
Adirondack Park
Mountains of New York (state)